The Culpeper Minutemen was a militia group formed in 1775 in the district around Culpeper, Virginia.  Like minutemen in other British colonies, the men drilled in military tactics and trained to respond to emergencies "at a minute's notice".

Organization
The Culpeper Minutemen were organized on July 17, 1775 in the district created by the Third Virginia Convention consisting of the counties of Orange, Fauquier and Culpeper.  Recruitment began in September 1775 with four companies of 50 men from Fauquier and Culpeper counties each and two companies of 50 men from Orange County.  The District Committee of Safety determined that the militia was to meet under a large oak tree in "Clayton's old field" on the Catalpa estate near today's Yowell Meadow Park in Culpeper, Virginia.

Engagements
The Culpeper Minutemen fought for the colonial side in the first year of the American Revolution and are remembered for their company flag: a white banner depicting a rattlesnake, featuring the phrases "Liberty or Death" and "Don't Tread on Me". At the time, Culpeper was considered frontier territory.  In October 1775, the Minutemen were sent to Hampton in response to British ships attempting to land.  The riflemen were able to effectively shoot the men manning the ships cannons, and the fleet eventually sailed away.

The Culpeper militia next participated in the Battle of Great Bridge in December 1775.  The battle was a complete American victory.  There were accounts of the battle that suggested the British were unnerved by the reputation of the frontiersmen.

The Culpeper Minutemen disbanded in January 1776 under orders from the Committee of Safety.  Many of the minutemen continued to serve.  Some joined the continental line, and others fought under Daniel Morgan, such as William Lloyd, who lived from 1748 to 1834. After fighting in Morgan's group, he joined the 11th Virginia Regiment and encamped at Valley Forge; he was honorably discharged at Fort Sullivan in 1779. William died May 2, 1834, in Kentucky.

John Marshall, the fourth Chief Justice of the United States, was a member of the original Culpeper Minutemen.

American Civil War
In 1860, the Culpeper Minutemen were formed under the same oak tree where the 1775 Minutemen had organized.  They also carried the same rattlesnake flag. The unit became part of Company B, 13th Virginia Infantry and served in the Confederate States Army for the duration of the American Civil War.

Later Minutemen
According to the Museum of Culpeper History, the Minutemen were again organized for the Spanish–American War, but were never activated for duty. The Culpeper Minutemen were again organized for World War I, and joined the 116th Infantry.

References

External links
Culpeper history (town of Culpeper website)
Culpeper Minute Battalion, a reenacting group
History of the Culpeper flag
Museum of Culpeper History
Bibliography of the Continental Army in Virginia compiled by the United States Army Center of Military History
Virginia Defense Force

Flags of the American Revolution
Military units of Virginia in the American Revolution
Virginia militia
1775 establishments in Virginia